Octonoba yaeyamensis is a species of cribellate orb weaver in the family of spiders known as Uloboridae. It is endemic to the Yaeyama Islands in the Nansei Archipelago of Japan.

References

Uloboridae
Spiders described in 1981